The following is a list of notable Egyptians of at least partial Turkish descent.

List

Farida of Egypt, Queen of Egypt 
children:
Princess Farial of Egypt
Princess Fawzia Farouk of Egypt
Princess Fadia of Egypt
Nazli Sabri, first Queen of Egypt 
children: 
Faika of Egypt
Farouk of Egypt, King of Egypt and the Sudan
Fawzia of Egypt, Queen of Iran
Princess Fathia Ghali of Egypt
Princess Faiza Rauf of Egypt

Abbas II of Egypt, Khedive of Egypt
Princess Lulie, the first Muslim woman to study at Oxford University

Muhammad Abduh, religious scholar and liberal reformer
Tatamkulu Afrika, poet
Shajart al-Durr, the second Muslim woman to become a monarch in Islamic history  origin, and described by historians as a beautiful, pious and intelligent woman
Tawfiq al-Hakim, writer
Leila Ahmed, writer
Ismail Falaki, astronomer and mathematician
Mustafa Manfaluti, writer
Qasim Amin, jurist and women's rights activist 
Hussein Bikar, painter
Nonie Darwish, human rights activist
Nawal El Saadawi, feminist
Mustafa Fahmi, Prime Minister of Egypt
Abdel Rahman Fahmy, writer
Mohammad Farid, nationalist leader, writer and lawyer
Hussein Fakhry, minister of education & Prime Minister of Egypt
Laila Fawzi, Miss Egypt (1940) & actress
Dodi Fayed, film producer & last companion of Diana, Princess of Wales
Zakariyya Ahmad, musician
Mustafa Fazıl, Prince, third son of Ibrahim Pasha of Egypt and his consort Ulfat Qadin (died 1865) 
children:
Ismail Fazıl, Ottoman and Turkish politician 
Nazli Fazil, Princess
Mahmud Tahir Haqqi, writer
Yahya Haqqi, writer
Adel Adham, actor
Aziza Shukri Hussein, social welfare expert
Hafez Ibrahim, poet
Ekmeleddin İhsanoğlu, former Secretary-General of the Organisation of the Islamic Conference
Khalid Islambouli, army officer
Muhammad Jalal, writer
Yakup Kadri Karaosmanoğlu, writer
Ahmed Kamal, Egyptologist
Kasim Kutay, CEO of Novo Holdings A/S.
Amin Maalouf, writer
Ahmed Magdy, actor
Şemsettin Mardin, Turkish ambassador to Lebanon
Nihal Mazloum, jeweler and artisan
Ahmad Mazlum, cabinet minister and parliamentary leader
Cesa Nabarawi, feminist
Effat Nagy, artist, born to an Egyptian father, and a Turkish mother
Muhammad Naji, painter
 Muhammad Tawfiq Nasim, Prime Minister of Egypt
Mahmoud El Nokrashy, second prime minister of the Kingdom of Egypt
Wedad Orfi, filmmaker
Isma'il Pasha, Khedive of Egypt
Khedive Tewfik of Egypt
Tusun Pasha, father of Abbas I of Egypt
Poussi, actress 
Noura Qadry, actress
Ihsan Abdel Quddous
Ahmed Rami, poet
Hussein Refki, war minister and senator
Hussein Riad, actor
Hind Rostom, actress
Zaki Rostom, actor
Hussein Rushdi, PM, Prime Minister of Egypt
Ali Sabri, Prime Minister of Egypt
Sherif Sabri, Pasha, politician
Muhammad Said, Prime Minister of Egypt
children: 
Mahmoud Sa'id, painter
Hussein Salem, businessman
Abdel Khalek Sarwat, PM, Prime Minister of Egypt
Ahmed Zaki Abu Shadi, poet
Muhammad Sharif, Prime Minister of Egypt
 Ahmed Shawqi, writer
Shadia, actress
Fouad Shafiq, actor
Shwikar, actress
Gazbia Sirry, painter
Halil Şerif ("Khalil-Bey"), diplomat and art collector
Muhammed Taher, the "father" of the Mediterranean Games
Zain al-Saharaf, Queen, Queen of Jordan
Ahmed Taymour, writer
Aisha Taymuriyya, writer
Ibn Tulun, founder of the Tulunid dynasty
Hasan Tuwayrani, writer
Youssef Wahbi, actor
Adham Wanly, painter.
Seif Wanly, painter
Adly Yakan, PM, Prime Minister of Egypt
Nil Yalter, artist
Rose al Yusuf, actress and journalist
Safiya Zaghloul, political activist dubbed "Umm Al-Masryeen" ("the Mother of Egyptians")
Maurice Zilber, horse trainer
Youssef Zulficar, judge and father-in-law of Farouk of Egypt

See also
Ottoman Empire

List of Algerians of Turkish origin

References

Egyptian people of Turkish descent
Lists of people by ethnicity